In the social sciences and philosophy, a positive or descriptive statement concerns what "is", "was", or "will be", excluding statements of what is (in the absolute or true sense), was or will be moral. Positive statements are thus the opposite of normative statements. Positive statements are based on empirical evidence. For examples, "An increase in taxation will result in less consumption" and "A fall in supply of petrol will lead to an increase in its price". However, positive statements can be factually incorrect: "The moon is made of green cheese" is empirically false, but is still a positive statement, as it is a statement about what is, not what should be.

Positive statements and normative  statements 
Positive statements are distinct from normative statements. Positive statements are based on empirical evidence, can be tested, and involve no value judgements. Positive statements refer to what is and contain no indication of approval or disapproval. When values or opinions come into the analysis, then it is in the realm of normative economics. A normative statement expresses a judgment about whether a situation is desirable or undesirable, which can carry value judgements. These refer to what ought to be.

Use of positive statement 
Positive statements are widely used to describe something measurable, like the rate of  inflation in an economy. They are mainly used in explanations of theories and concepts. Using a positive statement does not mean you can't have your own opinions on issues. However, when you are writing academic essays it's important to use positive statements to support an argument, since they can be verified by evidence.

See also 
Falsifiability
Positivism
Normative statement

References

 
 https://web.archive.org/web/20070626195348/http://www.unc.edu/depts/econ/byrns_web/Economicae/Figures/Positive-Normative.htm Economae: An Encyclopedia

Statements
Philosophy of social science